The 2018–19 CAF Confederation Cup knockout stage will be played from 7 April to 26 May 2019. A total of eight teams will compete in the knockout stage to decide the champions of the 2018–19 CAF Confederation Cup.

Qualified teams
The winners and runners-up of each of the four groups in the group stage advance to the quarter-finals.

Format

In the knockout stage, the eight teams play a single-elimination tournament. Each tie is played on a home-and-away two-legged basis. If the aggregate score is tied after the second leg, the away goals rule will be applied, and if still tied, extra time will not be played, and the penalty shoot-out will be used to determine the winner (Regulations III. 26 & 27).

Schedule
The schedule of each round is as follows. Effective from the Confederation Cup group stage, weekend matches are played on Sundays while midweek matches are played on Wednesdays, with some exceptions. Kick-off times are also fixed at 13:00, 16:00 and 19:00 GMT.

Bracket
The bracket of the knockout stage is determined as follows:

The bracket was decided after the draw for the knockout stage (quarter-finals and semi-finals), which was held on 20 March 2019, 19:00 CAT (UTC+2), at the Marriot Hotel in Cairo, Egypt.

Quarter-finals

In the quarter-finals, the winners of one group played the runners-up of another group (teams from same group could not play each other), with the group winners hosting the second leg, and the matchups decided by draw.

CS Sfaxien won 3–2 on aggregate.

Étoile du Sahel won 5–2 on aggregate.

Zamalek won 1–0 on aggregate.

RS Berkane won 7–1 on aggregate.

Semi-finals

In the semi-finals, the four quarter-final winners played in two ties, with the matchups and order of legs decided by draw.

RS Berkane won 3–2 on aggregate.

Zamalek won 1–0 on aggregate.

Final

In the final, the two semi-final winners play each other, with the order of legs determined by the semi-final draw.

1–1 on aggregate. Zamalek won 5–3 on penalties.

Notes

References

External links
Total Confederation Cup 2018/2019, CAFonline.com

3
April 2019 sports events in Africa
May 2019 sports events in Africa